The 1942 South Dakota State Jackrabbits football team was an American football team that represented South Dakota State University in the North Central Conference during the 1942 college football season. In its second season under head coach Thurlo McCrady, the team compiled a 4–4 record and was outscored by a total of 92 to 65.

Schedule

References

South Dakota State
South Dakota State Jackrabbits football seasons
South Dakota State Jackrabbits football